In applied statistics, the Marshall–Olkin exponential distribution is any member of a certain family of continuous multivariate probability distributions with positive-valued components. It was introduced by Albert W. Marshall and Ingram Olkin. 
One of its main uses is in reliability theory, where the Marshall–Olkin copula models the dependence between random variables subjected to external shocks.

Definition
Let  be a set of independent, exponentially distributed random variables, where  has mean . Let

Concrete example 

Suppose b = 3. Then there are seven nonempty subsets of { 1, ..., b } = { 1, 2, 3 }; hence seven different exponential random variables:
 
Then we have:

References

 Xu M, Xu S. "An Extended Stochastic Model for Quantitative Security Analysis of Networked Systems". Internet Mathematics, 2012, 8(3): 288–320.

Statistics articles needing expert attention
Continuous distributions
Exponentials
Exponential family distributions